The Philippine Table Tennis Federation, Inc. (PTTFI) is the national governing body for table tennis in the Philippines. It is recognised by the Philippine Olympic Committee, Southeast Asian Table Tennis Association, the Asia Table Tennis Union, and the International Table Tennis Federation.

History 
The Table Tennis Association of the Philippines(TATAP) was formed in 1951 as a governing body for table tennis in the Philippines. In 2016, the Philippines Olympic Committee(POC) defunct TATAP as member of the National Sports Association(NSA). Philippine Table Tennis Federation, Inc.(PTTFI) replaced TATAP, which was later certified as a regular member of POC and the recognise by NSA as the sole governing body for table tennis.

Host Tournaments

Athletes

Olympics
Ian Lariba is the first Filipino table tennis player to compete at the Olympic Games.

Paralympics
Josephine Medina is the first Filipino table tennis player to compete at the Paralympics Game, 2012. She also became the first Filipino table tennis player to earn a medal in Paralympics, 2016.

SEA Games
Richard Gonzales is a multiple medalist at the Southeast Asian Games in Table Tennis.
Singles:  (2005, 2015),  (1999, 2009, 2013, 2017, 2019)
Doubles:  (2011)
Team:  (2005)

External links 
Table Tennis Association of the Philippines

References 

Philippines
Table Tennis